Anbarabad (also romanized as ‘Anbarābād; also known as Ambārābād) is a city and capital of Anbarabad County, Kerman Province, Iran.  At the 2006 census, its population was 18,590, in 3,997 families.  It is located to the southwest of Jiroft, off the Road 91. The local economy is agricultural based, with extensive fields around Anbarabad.

In 2003,  Anbarabad became recognized as a sub-provincial unit (county) and separated from Jiroft County which it had been belonged to. Most of the land around Anbarabad is steppe or sandy desert, but there is an extensive strip of fields between the city and the Route 91, indicating an agricultural importance in the area. Some species have been identified which are endemic to the Anbarabad area including those of the subfamily Thaumastellinae of the genus Thaumastella.

References

Populated places in Anbarabad County
Cities in Kerman Province